Bay Point, formerly West Pittsburg and originally Bella Vista is a census-designated place located in the East Bay region of the San Francisco Bay Area in Contra Costa County, California. Bay Point is just west of Pittsburg, California, and northeast of Concord, California, on the southern shore of Suisun Bay. The population of Bay Point was 21,349 as of 2010. The Pittsburg/Bay Point Station of the Bay Area Rapid Transit (BART) rail system is located adjacent to Bay Point in Pittsburg. The community is traversed by a freeway, State Route 4, the California Delta Highway. Being unincorporated, Bay Point does not have its own police department. The community is policed by the California Highway Patrol and the Contra Costa County Sheriff's Office. The ZIP code is 94565, and the area code is 925.

Geography

Bay Point borders Suisun Bay. The northwest portion is the neighborhood of Shore Acres.

Demographics

The 2010 United States Census reported that 21,349 people, 6,224 households, and 4,853 families resided in the CDP. The racial makeup of the CDP was 41.4% White (20.5% non-Hispanic), 11.6% African American (10.9% non-Hispanic), 1.1% Native American, 9.9% Asian, 0.7% Pacific Islander, 28.8% from other races, and 6.5% from two or more races. 54.9% of the population was Hispanic or Latino of any race.

The Census reported that 99.5% of the population lived in households, 0.1% lived in non-institutionalized group quarters, and 0.4% were institutionalized.

There were 6,224 households, out of which 50.6% had children under the age of 18 living in them, 49.0% were opposite-sex married couples living together, 20.1% had a female householder with no husband present, and 8.8% had a male householder with no wife present. 8.0% of households were unmarried opposite-sex partnerships and 0.6% were same-sex married couples or partnerships. 16.4% of households were made up of individuals, and 4.5% had someone living alone who was 65 years of age or older. The average household size was 3.41 and the average family size was 3.77.

The population was spread out, with 30.5% under the age of 18, 11.0% aged 18 to 24, 30.2% aged 25 to 44, 21.9% aged 45 to 64, and 6.5% who were 65 years of age or older. The median age was 40.1 years. For every 100 females, there were 99.7 males. For every 100 females age 18 and over, there were 97.3 males.

History
Bay Point was previously known by several names, including Bella Vista and, until 1993, West Pittsburg.  An election was held in 1993 to vote on renaming the community Bay Point, reviving a historical name used in this area. "West Pittsburg," the former name, was sometimes confused with the western unincorporated section of Pittsburg, California. Bay Point is similarly unincorporated.

Ambrose Park annexation
The neighboring City of Pittsburg annexed Ambrose Park in July 2008. Administrative control remained with the Ambrose Parks and Recreation District, which had owned and operated the site and its facilities since 1946. The move was designed to bring Pittsburg's greater development funding and general resources to a joint project to replace the long-time swimming pool facilities at the park. The new Ambrose Aquatic Center is tentatively scheduled to open on July 4, 2016. By population, about 20% of the Ambrose Parks and Recreation District is within Pittsburg City limits. Ambrose Park features picnic, tennis, basketball and hiking, and picnic facilities in 12.3 acres of unincorporated land at 125 Memorial Way, immediately adjacent to the City of Pittsburg. It was  a gift to the community from the local Enes family in 1947.

Education
Most of Bay Point is in the Mount Diablo Unified School District. A small portion is in the Pittsburg Unified School District.

In 1940 the only grammar school was Ambrose Elementary located on Willow Pass Road. The high school was in Pittsburg. A branch of the Contra Costa County Library is located in Bay Point at Riverview Middle School.  Bay Point is served by the Mt. Diablo Unified School District and has four public schools: Riverview Middle School (formerly Pacifica High School) for grades 6-8, Rio Vista Elementary School (formerly Riverview Middle School) for grades K-5, Shore Acres Elementary School for grades K-5 and Bel Air Elementary School for grades K-5.

References

External links

 Ambrose Park & Recreation District website
 Riverview Middle School website

 
Census-designated places in Contra Costa County, California
Census-designated places in California